Boize is a river of Schleswig-Holstein and Mecklenburg-Vorpommern, Germany. It flows into the Sude in Boizenburg.

See also
List of rivers of Schleswig-Holstein
List of rivers of Mecklenburg-Vorpommern

Rivers of Schleswig-Holstein
Rivers of Mecklenburg-Western Pomerania
Rivers of Germany